Jack Price (20 October 1928 – 23 February 2006) was  the British Darts Organisation's top darts referee and MC, seen frequently on television, throughout the 1970s until the mid-1980s. He died in February 2006, aged 77.

1928 births
2006 deaths
Darts people